Events from the year 1967 in Sweden

Incumbents
 Monarch – Gustaf VI Adolf 
 Prime Minister – Tage Erlander

Events
 3 September – Sweden switches from driving on the left-hand side to the right-hand side of the road. The day is known as Dagen H.

Births
 4 March – Jonas Edman, rifle shooter.
 17 April – Roger Johansson, ice hockey player.
 13 July – Roger Hansson, ice hockey player.

Deaths

 10 February – Anders Hylander, gymnast (born 1883).
 14 May – Fausto Acke, gymnast (born 1897).

Exact date unknown
 Gustav Hedenvind-Eriksson, writer (born 1880).
  – Ellen Hagen

References

 
Sweden
Years of the 20th century in Sweden